Elise Cranny (born May 9, 1996) is an American middle and long-distance runner. She was a member of the world record team for the women's 4x1500 meters relay, and also holds the indoor American record for 5000 meters. Cranny placed 13th in the 5000 meters at the 2020 Tokyo Olympic Games. Cranny is a two-time US National Champion in the 5000 meters capturing the title in 2021 and 2022.

Career
Cranny attended Niwot High School in Colorado, where she won two cross country state championships. In 2014 she competed in the Worlds U20 Championships, finishing 4th. She ran in college for Stanford, where she finished 2nd in four NCAA Division I Championships and was a 12 time All-American. After graduating in 2018, she turned professional with the Bowerman Track Club.

In a Bowerman Track Club inter-squad meet on July 31st, 2020, Cranny competed as a member of the 4 × 1500 metres relay team alongside Colleen Quigley, Karissa Schweizer, and Shelby Houlihan. The team ran a time of 16:27.02 which broke the previous world record of 16:33.58 from Team Kenya.

Among American competitors, Cranny posted the fastest 10000 metres and the second fastest 5000 metres time going into the 2021 US Olympic Trials. On June 21, 2021, winning in 94-degree heat in Eugene, Oregon, Cranny finished .3 seconds in front of Bowerman Track Club teammate Karissa Schweizer, qualifying for the U.S. Olympic team with a 15:27.81. Cranny ran the last 400 meters in 63.72 seconds. At the 2020 Summer Olympics in Tokyo, Cranny placed 13th in the Women's 5000 metres.

On February 11, 2022, Cranny set a new American record for the indoor 5000m at the David Hemery Valentine Invitational at Boston University, completing the event in 14:33.17, 14 seconds faster than Shalane Flanagan's mark of 14:47.

References

External links 
 
 
 
 
 

1996 births
Living people
American female middle-distance runners
American female long-distance runners
Stanford Cardinal women's track and field athletes
Track and field athletes from Colorado
Track and field athletes from Iowa
Stanford University alumni
USA Outdoor Track and Field Championships winners
Athletes (track and field) at the 2020 Summer Olympics
Olympic track and field athletes of the United States
21st-century American women